Hazleton Common, Horndean is a   Local Nature Reserve in Horndean in Hampshire. It is owned and managed by Horndean Parish Council.

The common is mainly lowland heath, together with ponds and areas of woodland. Fauna include common lizards, adders, grass snake, slow worms, broad-bodied chaser dragonflies, green woodpeckers and partridges.

References

Local Nature Reserves in Hampshire